Cabin Fever 2: Spring Fever (also known simply as Cabin Fever 2) is a 2009 American comedy horror film directed by Ti West and stars Noah Segan, Rusty Kelley, Alexi Wasser, Marc Senter, Rider Strong and Giuseppe Andrews. It is a sequel to the 2002 film Cabin Fever and the second installment overall in the Cabin Fever franchise. The film is about a high school prom that descends into chaos when a deadly flesh-eating bacteria spreads via a popular brand of bottled water.

Plot
Sometime after the events of the previous film, a very disfigured Paul (Rider Strong) escapes from the creek and wanders through the woods, leaving pieces of his own flesh along the way. When he finally manages to make it to the highway, he is splattered and killed by a school bus. His remains are checked by Deputy Winston Olsen (Giuseppe Andrews), the local policeman from the previous film. Winston assures the shocked bus driver that he has hit a moose.

The creek Paul was lying in turns out to be connected to a bottled-water company and the infected water was distributed to the local high school.

John (Noah Segan), a senior at the high school, is deciding whether to go to prom with his long-time crush Cassie (Alexi Wasser) or stay home. His friend Alex (Rusty Kelley) is against going until he hooks up with a girl named Liz (Regan Deal). She says if she can get off work that night, she will meet him there.

John asks Cassie to go to prom but she refuses. Meanwhile, Winston is at a restaurant where a worker from the bottled-water company dies from the infection. He then realizes the creek got heavily contaminated due to the fact he foolishly dumped Paul's body into the creek instead of driving him to the other hospital for quarantine and goes to the water plant to tell the officials that the water is contaminated. The worker he informs is quickly killed by a group of CCD (Contamination Control Division) soldiers in NBC suits. Winston leaves before they can get to him.

At the high school, the infection begins to spread slowly. Frederica (Amanda Jelks) dies in the swimming pool from the infection and Rick (Thomas Blake, Jr.) is killed when he drowns after hitting his head on the side of the pool and falling in. Alex is disappointed that Liz did not come, while John gets into a fight with Cassie's boyfriend Marc (Marc Senter). Principal Sinclair (Michael Bowen) then kicks John out. Cassie follows him and John angrily confesses his love to her. As popular girl Sandy (Lindsey Axelsson) is declared prom queen the CCD then forces John and Cassie back into the school. The CCD locks all of the main exits from the school and kills Principal Sinclair when he demands to know what is going on. The infection then begins to kill the students in the gym at an alarming rate. The gym is then gassed from the outside. Cassie, John, and Alex watched in horror as all the students are killed. Winston is picked up by his cousin Herman (Mark Borchardt), ready to leave town.

Alex discovers he is infected and that the disease is incurable necrotizing fasciitis. The only way to stop the infection is to amputate the infected limb. However, Alex's infection is already too severe and he stays behind. John begins to show signs of the infection too and lets Cassie amputate his hand to stop it.

Cassie's boyfriend Marc then comes out of nowhere, hits Cassie with a hammer, and tries to kill John but Cassie recovers and kills him with a nail gun. The two leave the school only to be ambushed by the CCD. John stalls them, allowing Cassie to escape. She finds herself on the highway and stops Herman's van. Winston and Herman take Cassie with them. The camera shows her back where she is starting to show signs of infection.

Meanwhile, Alex's date Liz is at her workplace. She is a stripper at Teazers and she spreads the infection to the customers, who in turn spread it further around the country and even to Mexico.

In a post-credits scene, Darryl and Dane are shown watching a movie and Dane says "prom blows".

Cast

 Noah Segan as John
 Rusty Kelley as Alex
 Alexi Wasser as Cassie
 Giuseppe Andrews as Deputy Winston Olsen 
 Regan Deal as Liz Grillington
 Marc Senter as Marc
 Michael Bowen as Principal Sinclair
 Lindsey Axelsson as Sandy
 Angela Oberer as Ms. Hawker 
 Amanda Jelks as Frederica
 Judah Friedlander as Toby
 Taylor Kowalski as Darryl
 Alexander Isaiah Thomas as Dane
 Patrick Durham as Banker Lucas
 Mark Borchardt as Herman
 Larry Fessenden as Bill 
 Lisa H. Sackerman as Sores Girl / Prom Goer
 Rider Strong as Paul
 Preston Corbell as Prom Goer

Production
The film was produced by Tonic Films, Morningstar Films, Carr Miller Entertainment, and Tunnel Post. The special effects are from Quantum Creation FX who created the make-up effects. Rider Strong and Giuseppe Andrews are the only two Cabin Fever cast members to come back for the sequel.

The film's production originally wrapped in April 2007.

After extensive re-editing and re-shooting by the producers, director Ti West requested to have his name removed from the film and replaced with the popular pseudonym Alan Smithee. Because he was not a member of the Directors Guild of America, his request was denied by the producers and he remains credited as the film's director. West has since disowned the final product claiming that it is more a product of the producers and executives than that of his own.

Soundtrack
The film score was composed by Ryan Shore. The film also featured songs are "Dancing On Our Graves" by Washington-based band The Cave Singers, "Prom Night" by Paul Zaza and Carl Zittrer from the 1980 film Prom Night and "Inner Station" by Minimal Compact.

Release
The film premiered on October 24, 2009 at the Mann Chinese 6 theaters in Hollywood, California as part of the 2009 Screamfest Horror Film Festival Los Angeles. The DVD was released in the USA on February 16, 2010 and in the UK on February 22. The US Blu-ray release comes with the Unrated Directors Cut version of Eli Roth's Cabin Fever.

Home media
The film was released on DVD on February 16, 2010.

References

External links
 

2009 horror films
2009 films
American comedy horror films
American satirical films
Films set in forests
Films shot in North Carolina
American sequel films
2000s high school films
2000s teen comedy films
American teen horror films
American high school films
Films about proms
Films directed by Ti West
Films scored by Ryan Shore
Lionsgate films
2009 comedy films
2000s English-language films
2000s American films